The 1965 Wellington City mayoral election was part of the New Zealand local elections held that same year. In 1965, elections were held for the Mayor of Wellington plus other local government positions including fifteen city councillors. The polling was conducted using the standard first-past-the-post electoral method.

Background
There was a rift within the Citizens' Association over their selected candidate for the mayoralty, Matt Benney. Benney was a first term councillor and formerly a reputable civil servant, serving as Under-secretary for Mines from 1940 until he retired in 1959. Benney was chosen as the Citizens' nominee for the mayoralty by the association's executive, but he withdrew his nomination after it became clear that a sizeable majority of sitting Citizens' councillors instead favoured deputy-mayor Denis McGrath. However McGrath declined to stand for mayor and offered himself only for the council. As the deadline for nominations neared a deputation of over 50 businessmen and Citizens' candidates asked Benney to again accept both the nomination and deputy-mayoralty, to which he agreed.

Kitts attracted criticism for insisting on standing for the council as well as the mayoralty. He had done so in the previous five elections (winning the mayoralty in the last three) but with both his large majority in the previous election combined with the frictions within the Citizens' Association, Kitts was expected to win the mayoralty comfortably. Labour supporters thought he should make way for another candidate on the council ticket and reduce the number of wasted votes that would be caused on an inevitable dual election. The Labour Party duly won more votes than the Citizens' Association for the council, including over 18,000 for Kitts, though this only translated into one extra council seat, still leaving the council with a Citizens' majority.

Mayoralty results

Councillor results

 
 
 
 
 
 
 
 
 
 
 
 
 
 
 
 
 
 
 
 
 
 
 
 
 
 
 
 
 
 
 

 

 

 
 

Table footnotes:

Notes

References

Mayoral elections in Wellington
1965 elections in New Zealand
Politics of the Wellington Region
1960s in Wellington
October 1965 events in New Zealand